Helheim is a Norwegian black metal band from Bergen, formed in 1992.

History 

Helheim was founded in 1992 by V'gandr (bass, vocals) and H'grimnir (guitar, vocals), who added drummer Hrymr. The band began performing in local Bergen festivals, and in 1993, the band released their debut demo, Helheim, distributed only within Norway.

Soon after the release of their first demo, the band began working on new material, again as a three-piece after Nidhogg, who had joined the band briefly, left the band again. In mid-1994, the band's second demo, Nidr ok Nordr liggr Helvegr, ("Netherwards and Northwards lies Helheim") was released, and caught the attention of German label Solistitium (now Millennium Music). The band signed to the label and released their debut album, Jormundgand (named for the World Serpent, Jörmungandr), which was recorded in Grieghallen in 1995. In 1996, Helheim followed up with a European tour.

After the tour, the band began recording their second album, Av Norrøn Ætt ("Of Norse Lineage"). With the release of the second album, the band's contract to Solistitium Records was fulfilled, and the band was without a label for two years. Finally, in 1999, the label Ars Metalli got in touch with Helheim, wanting to sign them for a one-album contract. The band members were initially apprehensive that the mainly underground label would be able to promote them adequately, but they were eager to begin work on new material.  After the band signed to the label, they were joined by Lindheim on synthesizer and Thorbjørn on lead guitars.

Utilizing a new producer, Odd Kronheim of the S.J.E.F Studio, the band recorded the MCD Terrorveldet ("The Realm of Terror"), and then another full-length album, Blod & Ild ("Blood & Fire"). Both albums received acclaim from the Norwegian metal press, the international press, and metal scenes. The CD also included their first music video, for the song "Jernskogen" ("The Ironforest") taken from the Blod & Ild release. In 2001, the band attempted to publish another MCD, Helsviti ("Hell's Punishment"), but due to difficulties with Ars Metalli this release was postponed indefinitely.

Despite these troubles, the band returned to Grieghallen to begin work on their next album, Yersinia Pestis. Massacre Records took the responsibility of releasing and distributing the album, which was well received by both critics and fans. Due to a lack of promotion, however, the album did not reach many fans outside of Norway. Massacre Records had initially agreed to publish the previously recorded MCD Helsviti as well, but this never came about.

In 2005, Lindheim decided to leave the band. In June 2006, the band released their fifth full-length album, The Journeys and Experiences of Death, a concept album focusing mainly on the Vikings' beliefs concerning death. The first 2,000 copies of the album were published through local label Dark Essence Records as a double digipack, which included, finally, the release of the MCD Helsviti.

Discography

Studio releases 
 Jormundgand (CD/LP, 1995)
 Av Norrøn Ætt (CD, 1997)
 Terrorveldet (MCD, 1999)
 Blod og Ild (CD, 2000)
 Yersinia Pestis (CD, 2003)
 The Journeys and the Experiences of Death/Helsviti (Double CD/Digi-Pack, 2006)
 The Journeys and the Experiences of Death (CD, 2006)
 Kaoskult (CD, 2008)
 Åsgards Fall (MCD, 2010)
 Heiðindómr ok mótgangr (CD, 2011)
 raunijaR (CD, 2015)
 landawarijaR (CD, 2017)
 Rignir (CD, 2019)
 WoduridaR (CD, 2021)

Lineup

Current members 
Hrymr – drums and programming (1992-present)
V'gandr – bass and vocals (1992-present)
H'grimnir – rhythm guitar and vocals (1992-present)
Noralf – lead guitar (2008-present)

Former members 
Lindheim – keyboards, synthesizers (1999–2005)
Thorbjørn – lead guitar (1999–2008)

Timeline

References

External links 
 
 

Norwegian black metal musical groups
Musical groups established in 1992
1992 establishments in Norway
Musical groups from Bergen